John Haddow was a Scottish football player and manager, best known for winning the 1958 Scottish Cup as manager of Clyde. Haddow played for Linlithgow Rose, Rangers, Dumbarton, King's Park, Falkirk and Leith Athletic.

Honours

Clyde
Scottish Cup (1) : 1957–58

References

Scottish footballers
Scottish football managers
Clyde F.C. managers
Rangers F.C. players
Dumbarton F.C. players
Bo'ness F.C. players
Falkirk F.C. players
Leith Athletic F.C. players
Scottish Football League players
Footballers from Stirling (council area)
King's Park F.C. players
Linlithgow Rose F.C. players
Scottish Football League managers
Association football forwards
Year of birth missing